Thomas Norton (1532–1584) was an English lawyer and politician.

Thomas Norton may also refer to:

Thomas Norton (alchemist) (d. 1513), English poet and alchemist
Sir Thomas Norton, 1st Baronet (1615–1691), English politician
Thomas Norton (died 1748), MP for Bury St Edmunds, 1727–1733
Thomas Norton (MP for Bristol), MP for Bristol, 1399, 1402, 1411–1414, 1417, 1420, 1421
Thomas Norton jnr, MP for Bristol, 1436